Gao Yang (born 1 November 1980) is a Chinese speed skater. She competed in two events at the 2002 Winter Olympics.

References

1980 births
Living people
Chinese female speed skaters
Olympic speed skaters of China
Speed skaters at the 2002 Winter Olympics
Sportspeople from Jilin
Speed skaters at the 2003 Asian Winter Games
Speed skaters at the 2007 Asian Winter Games